Jorge Rubén Lugones S.J. (July 31, 1952) is a prelate of the Roman Catholic Church. He served as bishop of Orán from 1999 until 2008, when he became bishop of Lomas de Zamora.

Life 
Born in Veinticinco de Mayo, Lugones became a member of the Society of Jesus on April 22, 1979. He was ordained to the priesthood on December 3, 1988.

On June 2, 1999, he was appointed bishop of Orán. Lugones received his episcopal consecration on the following July 30 from Jorge Mario Bergoglio, archbishop of Buenos Aires, the later pope Francis, with archbishop of Resistencia, Carmelo Juan Giaquinta, and archbishop emeritus of Resistencia, Juan José Iriarte, serving as co-consecrators. He was installed as bishop on August 6, 1999.

On October 14, 2008, he was appointed bishop of Lomas de Zamora. He was installed on the following November 22.

External links 

 catholic-hierarchy.org, Bishop Jorge Rubén Lugones

1952 births
20th-century Roman Catholic bishops in Argentina
21st-century Roman Catholic bishops in Argentina
Living people
Jesuit bishops
Argentine Jesuits
Argentine veterinarians
Roman Catholic bishops of Lomas de Zamora
Roman Catholic bishops of Orán